Jack Smith may refer to:

In sport

Jack Smith (Port Vale), footballer in 1892–1895
Jack Smith (footballer, born 1882) (1882 – after 1911), English player with Wolverhampton Wanderers and others
Jack Smith (footballer, born 1895) (1895–1946), Scottish player with Bolton Wanderers
Jack Smith (footballer, born 1898) (1898–1977), English international footballer
Jack Smith (footballer, born 1901), English footballer for Bradford City and Blackburn Rovers
Jack Smith (footballer, born 1910) (1910–1986), English player with Sheffield United
Jack Smith (footballer, born 1911) (1911–1975), Welsh player with Wolves; manager of West Bromwich Albion and Reading
Jack Smith (footballer, born 1915) (1915–1975), English player with Manchester United
Jack Smith (footballer, born 1936) (1936–2008), English player with Swindon Town
Jack Smith (footballer, born 1983), English player 
Jack Smith (footballer, born 1994), Scottish player
Jack Smith (footballer, born 2001), English player
Jack Smith (Australian footballer, born 1881) (1881–1927), Australian rules footballer for North Melbourne and Melbourne
Jack Smith (Australian footballer, born 1909) (1909–1983), Australian rules footballer for St Kilda and North Melbourne
Jack Smith (Gaelic footballer), Westmeath player
Jack Smith (end) (1917–2015), American football end
Jack Smith (defensive back) (born 1947), American football player
Jack Smith (American racing driver, born 1924) (1924–2001), American NASCAR driver
Jack Smith (American racing driver, born 1973) (born 1973), American NASCAR driver
Jack Smith (Australian racing driver) (born 1999), Australian racing driver
Jack Smith (sportsman) (1936–2020), English cricketer and rugby union player
Jack Smith (Australian cricketer) (born 1977), Australian cricketer
Jack Smith (outfielder) (1895–1972), Major League Baseball player
Jack Smith (pitcher) (1935–2021), Major League Baseball player
Jack Smith (third baseman) (1893–1962), Major League Baseball player
Jack Smith (coach), American college football, baseball and basketball coach for Hofstra
Jack Smith (speedway rider) (born 1998), British speedway rider
Jack Smith (wheelchair rugby) (born 1991), British Paralympian

In media

Whispering Jack Smith (1896–1950), American musician
Jack Martin Smith (1911–1993), Hollywood art director
Smilin' Jack Smith (1913–2006), American crooner, radio/television host and actor
Jack Smith (columnist) (1916–1996), Los Angeles journalist
John O'Neill (musician, born 1926) (1926–1999), English musician credited as Whistling Jack Smith
Jack Smith (film director) (1932–1989), American underground film director
John F. Smith, American soap opera writer
Jack Thomas Smith (born 1969), American producer, writer and director

In other fields

Jack W. Smith (1882/83–?), British trade union activist
Jack Smith (politician) (1901–1967), Liberal party member of the Canadian House of Commons
Jack Carington Smith (1908–1972), Australian artist
Jack Smith (artist) (1928–2011), British abstract artist
John F. Smith Jr. (born 1938), American business executive, CEO of General Motors
Jack Smith (Hotmail), co-founder of Hotmail
Jack Smith (lawyer) (born c. 1968), American lawyer and special counsel

Characters
Jack Smith (American Dad!), character in U.S. animated TV series American Dad!

See also
John Smith (disambiguation)
Jackie Smith (disambiguation)